Monaco competed at the 1968 Summer Olympics in Mexico City, Mexico. Two competitors, both men, took part in one event in one sport.

Results by athlete

Shooting

50 metre rifle, prone position
Joe Barral — 577 points (→ 83rd place)
Gilbert Scorsoglio — 573 points (→ 85th place)

References

External links
Official Olympic Reports

Nations at the 1968 Summer Olympics
1968
Summer Olympics